Ahmed ibn Ahmed ibn abi-Hamid al'Adawi al-Maliki al-Azhari al-Khalwati ad-Dardir (1715 – 1786 CE) (AH 1127 – 1204 AH ) known as Imam ad-Dardir or Dardir was a prominent late jurist in the Maliki school from Egypt. His Sharh as-Saghir and Sharh al-Kabir are two of the most important books of fatwa (Islamic legal rulings) in the Maliki school. His al-Kharida al-Bahiyya ("The Radiant Pearl") is a widespread primer on Ash'ari aqida.

See also

 List of Ash'aris and Maturidis
 List of Muslim theologians
 List of Islamic scholars

References

1715 births
1786 deaths
Asharis
18th-century Muslim theologians
Egyptian Maliki scholars
Al-Azhar University alumni